Nasrovan (also Romanized as Naşrovān, Nas̄ārvān, Naşravān, and Naşrevān) is a village in Nasrovan Rural District, in the Central District of Darab County, Fars Province, Iran. At the 2006 census, its population was 1,547, in 340 families.

References 

Populated places in Darab County